Colquencha is a town in Aroma Province in the La Paz Department, Bolivia. It is the seat of the Colquencha Municipality.

References 

 Instituto Nacional de Estadistica de Bolivia

Populated places in La Paz Department (Bolivia)